The Vought OS2U Kingfisher is an American catapult-launched observation floatplane. It was a compact mid-wing monoplane, with a large central float and small stabilizing floats. Performance was modest because of its low-powered engine. The OS2U could also operate on fixed, wheeled, taildragger landing gear.

The OS2U was the main shipboard observation seaplane used by the United States Navy during World War II, and 1,519 of the aircraft were built. It served on battleships and cruisers of the US Navy, with the United States Marine Corps in Marine Scouting Squadron Three (VMS-3), with the United States Coast Guard at coastal air stations, at sea with the Fleet Air Arm of the Royal Navy, and with the Soviet Navy. The Royal Australian Air Force also operated a few Kingfishers from shore bases.

The Naval Aircraft Factory OS2N was the designation of the OS2U-3 aircraft built by the Naval Aircraft Factory in Philadelphia, Pennsylvania. The OS2U first flew on 1 March 1938.

Design and development
In the late 1930s, Vought engineer Rex B. Beisel was tasked with designing an observation monoplane aircraft for the U.S. Navy suitable for many tasks, including directing battleship fire. In replacing the standard biplane observation aircraft with a more modern monoplane design, Beisel incorporated innovations making it the first production type to be assembled with spot welding, a process Vought and the Naval Aircraft Factory jointly developed to create a smooth fuselage that resisted buckling and generated less drag. Beisel also introduced high-lift devices, spoilers and in a unique arrangement, deflector plate flaps and drooping ailerons located on the trailing edge of the wing were deployed to increase the camber of the wing and thus create additional lift.

For combat missions, the pilot had a .30-caliber Browning M1919 machine gun, the receiver mounted low in the right front cockpit, firing between the engine cylinder heads, while the radio operator/gunner manned another .30-caliber machine gun (or a pair) on a flexible Scarff ring mount. The aircraft could also carry two 100 lb bombs or two 325 lb depth charges. Additionally, the "Kingfisher", as it was designated, served as a trainer in both its floatplane and landplane configurations.

Beisel's first prototype flew in 1938, powered by an air-cooled, 450 hp Pratt & Whitney R-985-4 Wasp Junior radial engine.

Operational history

The first 54 Kingfishers were delivered to the U.S. Navy beginning in August 1940 and six had been assigned to the Pearl Harbor-based Battle Force before the end of the same year. Many of the following 158 OS2U-2s were attached to flight training at Naval Air Station Pensacola, Florida, but 53 were assigned to equip the newly established Inshore Patrol Squadrons, based at NAS Jacksonville, Florida. In 1942, nine more Inshore Patrol Squadrons were established, all exclusively equipped with OS2N-1s built by the Naval Aircraft Factory.

The Kingfisher was widely used as a shipboard, catapult-launched scout plane on U.S. Navy battleships, heavy cruisers, and light cruisers during World War II and played a major role in support of shore bombardments and air-sea rescue. Two examples showing the plane's rescue capabilities include the recovery of World War I ace Eddie Rickenbacker and his crew from the Pacific in November 1942 and Lieutenant John A. Burns' unique use of the aircraft on 30 April 1944 to taxi airmen rescued from Truk Lagoon to the submarine , which was serving rescue duty near the atoll on that date. In all, LT Burns rescued 10 survivors on two trips and was awarded the Navy Cross for his efforts.

The United States Coast Guard also received 76 OS2U-3 Kingfishers starting in 1942, under whom they engaged in anti-submarine warfare, reconnaissance, and search and rescue roles. No Coast Guard Kingfisher is credited with sinking any enemy submarines, however they were successful in rescuing sailors from ships sunk by enemy torpedoes. The Coast Guard operated Kingfishers until October, 1944.

Australia received 18 Kingfishers from a batch of aircraft ordered by the Dutch East Indies that was diverted to Australia in 1942. They were initially used as training aircraft for pilots destined for flying boats, but in 1943, they were used to equip No. 107 Squadron RAAF, which carried out convoy escort duties until disbanded in October 1945. One Kingfisher was used in support of the Australian National Antarctic Research Expedition in 1947–48.

Throughout its U.S. Navy service, the OS2U and even its predecessor, the Curtiss SOC Seagull served much longer than planned, as the planned successor, the Curtiss SO3C Seamew, suffered from an insufficiently powerful engine which was a complete failure. The OS2U was only slowly replaced in the latter stages of World War II with the introduction of the Curtiss SC Seahawk, the first examples reaching the U.S. Navy in October 1944.

Variants

XOS2U-1
Prototype Vought Model VS.310 powered by a 450 hp (336 kW) Pratt & Whitney R-985-4 engine, one built.
OS2U-1
Initial production variant as the prototype but powered by a 450 hp (336 kW) Pratt & Whitney R-985-48, 54 built.
OS2U-2
Production variant with minor equipment changes and powered by a 450 hp (336 kW) Pratt & Whitney R-985-50, 158 built.
OS2U-3
Based on the OS2U-2 with self-sealing fuel tanks, armour protection, two .30 cal (7.62 mm) guns (dorsal and nose mounted), and able to carry 325 lb (147 kg) of depth charges or 100 lb (45 kg) bombs, powered by a 450 hp (336 kW) Pratt & Whitney R-985-AN2 engine, 1006 built.
OS2U-4
Two aircraft converted with narrow-chord and high-aspect ratio wings, also fitted with full-span flaps. Not developed.
OS2N-1
Naval Aircraft Factory built OS2U-3 with a 450 hp (336 kW) Pratt & Whitney R-985-AN-2 or -AN-8 engine, 300 built.
Kingfisher I
British designation for the OS2U-3, 100 delivered to the Royal Navy.

Operators

Royal Australian Air Force
No. 107 Squadron RAAF

 15 aircraft, operated 1942–1957.

 Cuban Naval Aviation
 Operated four aircraft between 1942 and 1959.

(Three aircraft)

 Mexican Navy
 Six aircraft, 201 Squadron.

 24 aircraft, not delivered in time for hostilities.

Soviet Naval Aviation
 2 aircraft on the ship USS Milwaukee (Murmansk)

Fleet Air Arm
 Received 100 aircraft.

United States Navy
United States Marine Corps
United States Coast Guard – the USCG operated 76 aircraft.

Uruguayan Navy 
 Received six OS2U-3s in 1942 to 1959 under Lend Lease.

Aircraft on display

At least eight Kingfishers survive in collections of historic aircraft around the world:

Australia
 OS2U-3
5985 – Whale World, Albany, Western Australia. It is waiting to be restored. Originally built for the Netherlands Navy in the Dutch East Indies, it was transferred to the RAAF in 1942, serving with Seaplane Training Flight (later 3 OTU) and 107 Sqn before being sold as war surplus in 1945. Now with Pioneer Aero Ardmore New Zealand for restoration, see below.

Chile
OS2U-3
5925 – Museo Nacional Aeronáutico y del Espacio, Santiago.

Cuba
OS2U-3
bureau number unknown (marked #50) – Museum of the Revolution (Museo de la Revolución), Havana, Cuba. It is fitted with fixed landing gear rather than a float.

New Zealand
 OS2U-3
5985 – Pioneer Aero, Auckland, New Zealand.  Currently undergoing restoration.  Originally built for Netherlands Navy in Dutch East Indies, it was transferred to the RAAF in 1942, serving with Seaplane Training Flight (later 3 OTU) and 107 Sqn before being sold as war surplus in 1945.
5982- Pioneer Aero, Auckland, New Zealand. Currently in Storage for future restoration.

United States
 On display
 OS2U-3
1368 (marked #60, painted as 0951) – Obtained years ago from Mexico, this aircraft was previously displayed aboard the battleship  and is now displayed inside the aircraft pavilion adjacent to the battleship in Mobile, Alabama. The building and the aircraft sustained some damage from Hurricane Katrina in 2005.
5909 – Boeing Aviation Hangar at the Steven F. Udvar-Hazy Center, National Air and Space Museum at Dulles International Airport outside of Washington, DC.
5926 – National Naval Aviation Museum at NAS Pensacola, Florida. It was one of six OS2U-3 Kingfishers that were transferred by Lend-Lease to the National Navy of Uruguay during World War II. This aircraft operated as a seaplane until 1958 and was obtained in 1971.

3073, (marked #8 based on assigned air group) – is on board the battleship  in Wilmington, NC. With the assistance of a Royal Canadian Air Force Piasecki helicopter, Lynn Garrison salvaged this Kingfisher from Calvert Island (British Columbia), during the winter of 1963. It crashed there on a ferry flight to Alaska during World War II. It was initially restored for display by volunteers at Vought Aeronautics in Grand Prairie, TX
 In storage
 OS2U-3
bureau number unknown – in storage at the Yanks Air Museum, Chino, California.

Specifications (OS2U-3)

See also

References

Notes

Bibliography

 Adcock, Al. OS2U Kingfisher in Action (Aircraft in Action No. 119). Carrollton, Texas: Squadron/Signal Publications, Inc., 1991. .
 Bowers, Peter M. United States Navy Aircraft since 1911. Annapolis, Maryland: Naval Institute Press, 1990, pp. 447–448. .
 Doll, Thomas E., and B.R. Jackson. "Vought-Sikorsky OS2U Kingfisher". Aircraft in Profile, Volume 14. Windsor, Berkshire, UK: Profile Publications Ltd., 1974, pp. 113–136. .
 Eden, Paul and  Soph Moeng, eds. The Complete Encyclopedia of World Aircraft. London: Amber Books Ltd., 2002, .
 Hickman, Patrick M. The Aircraft Collection. Pensacola, Florida: The Naval Aviation Museum Foundation, Inc., 2010.
 Pattison, Barry. Kingfisher in the Antipodes. Glen Waverly, Victoria 3150, Australia: Red Roo Model Publications, 1998.
 Steinemann, Peter. "Protector of the Plate". Air International, Vol. 42, No. 2, February 1992. pp. 73–78. .
 Sturtivant, Ray and M. Burrow. Fleet Air Arm Aircraft: 1939 to 1945.  Tonbridge, Kent, UK: Air Britain (Historians) Ltd, 1995. .
 Vincent, David. "Kangaroo Kingfishers". Air Enthusiast, No. 77, September/October 1998. Stamford, UK: Key Publishing. pp. 54–62. .

External links

 Wainwright, Marshall. "Kingfisher goes to war" Air Classics, June 2004.
 "Slingshot Planes" Popular Science, May 1943 also page 62 of the same article
 NavSource Online: Battleship Photo Archive Vought OS2U Kingfisher
			

OS02U
Floatplanes
1930s United States military reconnaissance aircraft
 Single-engined tractor aircraft
Carrier-based aircraft
 Naval Aircraft Factory aircraft
 World War II reconnaissance aircraft of the United States
 Low-wing aircraft
 Aircraft first flown in 1938